Gregory Andrew Rikaart (born February 26, 1977) is an American actor. He is best known for playing Kevin Fisher on the television soap opera The Young and the Restless since 2003, and also playing Leo Stark on Days Of Our Lives.

Throughout his career, Rikaart has received six nominations for the Daytime Emmy Award for Outstanding Supporting Actor in a Drama Series and won once in 2005.

Early life
Rikaart was born and raised in New York City; born in Brooklyn and raised in Staten Island. He graduated with honors from Villanova University in Pennsylvania. He has a sister, Keri. While in college, he spent a semester in Washington, D.C., as an intern for a congressman on Capitol Hill.

Career
Rikaart is best known for his role as Kevin Fisher on the CBS daytime soap opera The Young and the Restless, which he originated in 2003. In May 2017, Rikaart confirmed earlier reports that he would be exiting the soap with his last taping date to be the following month. However, on August 3, the official Twitter account for The Young and the Restless confirmed Rikaart was back taping. In September, Entertainment Weekly reported that Rikaart was back for a 2-week stint.

Personal life
In June 2013, Rikaart revealed that he was in a committed relationship with writer Robert Sudduth. Rikaart posted a photograph with his boyfriend captioned, "Not getting married anytime soon, but celebrating #equality tonight nonetheless", in response to the 2013 United States Supreme Court decisions in favor of same-sex marriage equality.

Rikaart and Sudduth married in Maui, Hawaii on May 9, 2015.  Their first child, a son named Montgomery, was born June 12, 2016, via surrogacy.

Filmography

Awards and nominations

References

External links

 Greg Rikaart Interview

1977 births
Living people
American male film actors
American male soap opera actors
American male television actors
Daytime Emmy Award winners
Daytime Emmy Award for Outstanding Supporting Actor in a Drama Series winners
American gay actors
LGBT people from New York (state)
People from Brooklyn
People from Staten Island
Villanova University alumni
21st-century American male actors